Trece Mártires (Spanish for Thirteen Martyrs) may refer to:

Thirteen Martyrs of Cavite, Philippine nationalists executed by the Spanish in 1896
 Trece Martires City, Cavite, Philippines, named after them.
Thirteen Martyrs of Bagumbayan, executed in 1897